The Power of the Invisible Sun is a philanthropic work on behalf of Bobby Sager.  It consists of a photography book based on pictures of those areas of the world most stricken by war such as Afghanistan, Rwanda, Pakistan, Palestine, Sri Lanka, Kenya or Zimbabwe, depicting children living and dealing with conflict.  Its aim is to inspire activism through the intimate encounters with those children provided by the images.

As part of this project, comes the initiative of using the benefits coming from the selling of the book to the "Hope is a game-changer project" providing the kids over the most difficult places around the world with indestructible soccer balls as a lasting symbol of hope.

Hope is the most important thing that people need to move forward.  The slightest ray of hope can ignite the human spirit's ability to overcome:  the power of the invisible sun - Bobby Sager.

Sting 
Sting, friends with Bobby Sager, has been one of the most active partners supporting this project, attending to the Parties to add a value through his recognition among the media. In fact, the power of the invisible sun pays homage to his song "Invisible Sun". He has also written the foreword for the book.

References

External links 
 Official Website
 
 The Power of the Invisible Sun in the news

Books of photographs